Harakeya Kuri  is a 1992 Indian Kannada political drama film directed and produced by K. S. L. Swamy (Lalitha Ravee). Starring Vishnuvardhan, Prakash Rai and Geetha in lead roles, the film was based on the novel of the same name by Chandrashekhara Kambara. The film was Prakash Rai's first film as a lead character.

Based on a true story, Harakeya Kuri was critically acclaimed and went on to win National Film Award for Best Feature Film in Kannada.

Awards
 Won National Film Award for Best Feature Film in Kannada

Cast
 Vishnuvardhan as Sidlingu
 Prakash Rai as Prakash
 Geetha as Rosie
 Srinath
 H. G. Dattatreya as Danappa
 H. G. Somashekar Rao
 Gangadhar
 Master Hirannaiah
 Ramesh Pandit
 B. M. Venkatesh
 K. S. L. Swamy
 B. Suresha as a television journalist

References

External links 
 

1992 films
1990s Kannada-language films
Films based on Indian novels
Films scored by Vijaya Bhaskar
Kannada literature
Best Kannada Feature Film National Film Award winners
Films directed by K. S. L. Swamy